The 1972 Suisse Open Gstaad was a men's tennis tournament played on outdoor clay courts in Gstaad, Switzerland. It was the 27th edition of the tournament and was held from 10 July until 16 July 1972. The tournament was part of the Grand Prix tennis circuit and was categorized as a Group C event. Andrés Gimeno won the singles title.

Finals

Singles

 Andrés Gimeno defeated  Adriano Panatta 7–5, 9–8, 6–4

Doubles
 Andrés Gimeno  /  Antonio Muñoz defeated  Adriano Panatta /  Ion Țiriac 9–8, 4–6, 6–1, 7–5

References

External links
 Official website
 ATP – tournament profile
 ITF – tournament edition details

Swiss Open (tennis)
Swiss Open Gstaad
1972 Grand Prix (tennis)
Swiss Open Gstaad